John Sheldon Olliff (1 December 1908 – 29 June 1951) was an English tennis player, author and sportsjournalist.

Life 
Olliff took part in the Wimbledon Championships from 1928. In singles, he advanced to the fourth round several times until 1939. In doubles, he reached the semifinals with his partner Ronnie Shayes where they lost to Harold Hare and Frank Wilde. At the French Championships, Olliff reached the fourth round in 1932. He also played at the US Championships in 1929 and 1930, advancing to the quarterfinals in the last year.

Olliff won 24 tournaments in his career as a tennis player such as: the Northern Lawn Tennis Championships (1928, 1929, 1931), the Irish Championships (1930), the Queen's Club Championships (1931) and the Surrey Grass Court Championships (1938). In addition he won single titles at the Westgate-on-Sea Tournament (1938) on hard asphalt. After the Second World War, he played a match for the British Davis Cup team in the first round against France in 1946. With Henry Billington, he lost against Marcel Bernard and Bernard Destremau.

After his active career, he took a job as a sportsjournalist at the Daily Telegraph and succeeded A. Wallis Myers as tennis correspondent. He died of a heart attack on the way to a match at Wimbledon on 29 June 1951. His successor at the Telegraph became Lance Tingay.

Bibliography 
 The Groundwork of Lawn Tennis. Methuen & Co., London 1934.
 Olliff on Tennis. Eyre and Spottiswoode, London 1948.
 The Romance of Wimbledon. London 1949.
 Lawn Tennis. Pitman & Sons, London 1950.
 Lawn Tennis for Beginners. W. & G. Foyle, London 1951.

References

External links 
 
 
 

1908 births
1951 deaths
British sports journalists
Tennis writers
English male tennis players
Tennis people from Greater London
British male tennis players